Antônio Cavilhas Rocha (born 13 June 1944) is a Brazilian chess International Master (IM) (1979), two times Brazilian Chess Championship winner (1964, 1969).

Biography
From the begin of 1960s to begin of 1980s, Antônio Cavilhas Rocha was one of Brazil's leading chess players. He won two gold (1964, 1969) and silver (1963) medal in Brazilian Chess Championships. Antônio Cavilhas Rocha three times participated in World Chess Championships South American Zonal tournaments (1963, 1966, 1969). His best result in this tournaments was 7th place in 1963.

Antônio Cavilhas Rocha played for Brazil in the Chess Olympiads:
 In 1960, at first reserve board in the 14th Chess Olympiad in Leipzig (+2, =2, -3),
 In 1964, at third board in the 16th Chess Olympiad in Tel Aviv (+3, =4, -6),
 In 1966, at second board in the 17th Chess Olympiad in Havana (+0, =2, -5),
 In 1968, at fourth board in the 18th Chess Olympiad in Lugano (+5, =7, -3),
 In 1970, at second board in the 19th Chess Olympiad in Siegen (+8, =7, -3),
 In 1984, at second reserve board in the 26th Chess Olympiad in Thessaloniki (+1, =5, -1).

Antônio Cavilhas Rocha played for Brazil in the South American Team Chess Championship:
 In 1989, at fourth board in the 1st South American Team Chess Championship in Mar del Plata (+0, =0, -1) and won team silver medal.

There was no reliable information about the life of Antônio Cavilhas Rocha after 1995.

References

External links

Antônio Cavilhas Rocha chess games at 365chess.com

1944 births
Living people
Sportspeople from Rio Grande do Sul
Brazilian chess players
Chess International Masters
Chess Olympiad competitors
20th-century chess players